Philip Sherburne is an American journalist, musician and DJ based in Barcelona. He coined the term "Microhouse" (in a 2001 article for The Wire) and appeared in the film Speaking in Code.

Career
Sherburne is a critic and columnist for Pitchfork and The Wire. He is also the electronic/dance editor for Rhapsody.com. He regularly appears on Resident Advisor and eMusic.com and has contributed to a number of publications which include: The New York Times, Spin, Slate, frieze, XLR8R, Wired, Rhapsody, Spain's Trax, and Germany's Groove and De:Bug. His has also contributed to books such as Audio Culture: Readings in Modern Music, Time Out 1000 Songs to Change Your Life and The Pitchfork 500: Our Guide to the Greatest Songs from Punk to the Present.

When not working as a journalist, he is a DJ at night. He has performed in Berlin, Barcelona, Hamburg, Montreal, Chicago, Austin, Seattle, Portland, New York, Bristol, Chile, and Mexico.

Discography
Philip Sherburne, "Lumberjacking" (Lan Muzic, 2007)
Guillaume & the Coutu Dumonts, "Les Gans (Philip Sherburne Remix)" (Musique Risquée, 2008)
Peter Van Hoesen, "L.O.C. (Philip Sherburne's Lungbutter Remix)" (Lan Muzic, 2008)
Philip Sherburne, Salt & Vinegar EP (Lan Muzic, 2008)
Echologist feat. Spaceape, The Mercy Dubz: Philip Sherburne's Triple Bypass Dub + Philip Sherburne's Resurrection Dub (Resopal Red, 2009)

References

External links
 Philip Sherburne
 Lan Muzik

Living people
Year of birth missing (living people)